Daniel Namir (born 12 August 1997) is an Israeli swimmer. He competed in the men's 4 × 200 metre freestyle relay at the 2020 Summer Olympics.

References

External links
 
 
 
 
 
 

1997 births
Living people
Israeli male swimmers
Israeli male freestyle swimmers
Olympic swimmers of Israel
Swimmers at the 2020 Summer Olympics
People from Netanya
20th-century Israeli people
21st-century Israeli people